Domingo Márquez was an Argentine actor. He starred in films like The Best Father in the World  (1941), Los martes, orquídeas (1941), Filomena Marturano (1950), and The Fire Girl (1952). He had a minor role in the acclaimed Silver Condor-winning 1943 film Juvenilia.

Career 

Márquez was a brilliant supporting actor and protagonist, who covered important roles in about 40 films. He shared the stage with great giants of national cinema such as Mirtha Legrand, Maria Esther Buschiazzo, Betty Colman, Agustín Barrios, Tito Alonso, Julio Renato, Nélida Solá, Nélida Bilbao, Eduardo Rudy, Armando Durán, among others.

In 1946 he joined the list of The Democratic Actors Association, during the government of Juan Domingo Perón, and whose board of directors was composed of Pablo Racioppi, Lydia Lamaison, Pascual Nacaratti, Alberto Barcel and Domingo Mania.

Filmography 

 1940: Un señor mucamo
 1940: Ha entrado un ladrón como Jorge Grondona
 1941: El mejor papá del mundo
 1941: Los martes, orquídeas
 1942: El tercer beso
 1942: Adolescencia
 1942: Tú eres la paz
 1943: Juvenilia
 1944: Nuestra Natacha
 1944: Su mejor alumno
 1946: El gran amor de Bécquer
 1946: Rosa de América
 1946: Milagro de amor
 1946: La sombra del pasado
 1947: La copla de la Dolores
 1947: Los hijos del otro
 1948: Recuerdos de un ángel
 1948: Rodríguez supernumerario
 1949: La cuna vacía
 1950: Bólidos de acero
 1950: Filomena Marturano
 1951: El mucamo de la niña
 1951: Tierra extraña
 1952: La niña de fuego
 1953: ¡Qué noche de casamiento!
 1953: La tía de Carlitos
 1954: Romeo y Julita
 1956: Sangre y acero
 1965: Canuto Cañete, detective privado como un prefecto
 1966: De profesión sospechosos...Carlos
 1966: La cómplice como un empleado de la fábrica
 1968: El novicio rebelde
 1969: Corazón contento
 1971: Siempre te amaré
 1971: Aquellos años locos
 1972: Juan Manuel de Rosas

Theater 

Witness to the gallows, with the Argentine comedy company headed by Amelia Bence, with Pablo Acciardi and Alberto Berco.

Carlos's Aunt (1951), by Brandon Thomas, directed by Enrique Santos Discépolo at the Casino Theater, along with Pablo Palitos, Gloria Ugarte, Patricia Castell, Agustín Barrios, Lalo Malcolm, Sara Olmos, María Armand and Tito Licausi.

Filomena Marturano (1948), with a company headed by Tita Merello and Guillermo Battaglia, at the Teatro Politeama, directed by Luis Mottura. Also in the cast were Esther Bustamante, Agustín Barrios, Betty Colman, Tito Alonso, Edna Norrell and Alberto de Mendoza.

References

External links
 

Argentine male film actors
20th-century Argentine male actors